Ogcocephalus parvus, the roughback batfish, is a species of batfish found along the coast of the western Atlantic Ocean from North Carolina in the United States to Brazil.  This species grows to a length of  TL.

References
 
 M. G. Bradbury, The genera of batfishes (family Ogcocephalidae), Copeia, Vol. 1967, No. 2 (June 5, 1967), pp. 399–422.

Ogcocephalidae
Fish of the Atlantic Ocean
Taxa named by William Harding Longley
Taxa named by Samuel Frederick Hildebrand
Fish described in 1940